Syrian Brazilians are Brazilian citizens of full, partial, or predominantly Syrian ancestry, or Syrian-born immigrants in Brazil.

History 
Syrians have immigrated to Brazil beginning in the 19th century, the population of Brazil of either full or partial Syrian descent is estimated by the Brazilian government to be around 3 or 4 million people. Syrians, along with Lebanese and East Asian descendants, make up the majority of the Asian Brazilian community in the country. According to research conducted by IBGE in 2008, 0.9% of White Brazilian respondents said they had familial origins from the Middle East, which equals less than 1 million people. They are mostly of Lebanese and Syrian descent.

See also 

 Immigration to Brazil
 Lebanese Brazilians

References 

Arab Brazilian
 
Ethnic groups in Brazil
Syrian diaspora in South America